English singer Rachel Stevens, a member of pop group S Club, has recorded songs for two solo studio albums, some of which were collaborations with other recording artists. Stevens has also contributed vocals for charity singles.

Her debut studio album, entitled Funky Dory, was released in September 2003. The lead single, "Sweet Dreams My LA Ex", was co-written by Ivor Novello Award winner Cathy Dennis. Dennis also contributed to two other tracks on the album: "Glide" and "Little Secret". "Glide" was written in collaboration with Swedish production team Bloodshy & Avant, while "Little Secret" was co-written with Guy Chambers. The album's self-titled second single was penned by Gary Clark and Martin Brammer, and contained a sample of David Bowie's song "Andy Warhol". British songwriter Richard X received a writing credit for the song "Some Girls" alongside Hannah Robinson.

Stevens released her second album called Come and Get It in October 2005. It was preceded by the lead single called "Negotiate with Love", a dance-pop song which was written by Swedish production duo Vacuum and Australian siblings Nervo. The second single, "So Good", was co-written by Pascal Gabriel and Hannah Robinson. Robinson also collaborated with Richard X on the song "Crazy Boys". Stevens co-wrote the song "Funny How" with British production team Xenomania. "I Said Never Again (But Here We Are)", the album's third and final single, was written by the duo Jewels & Stone and Rob Davis.

Songs

Notes

 "Do They Know It's Christmas?" was performed by Band Aid 20.

References

External links
List of Rachel Stevens songs at AllMusic

Lists of songs recorded by British artists